Mason Tony Mount (born 10 January 1999) is an English professional footballer who plays as an attacking or central midfielder for  club Chelsea and the England national team. 

Mount began his senior club career with Chelsea, and joined Vitesse and Derby County on consecutive loans between 2017 and 2019. He established himself as an integral player for Chelsea in the following years, and won the UEFA Champions League, the UEFA Super Cup, and the FIFA Club World Cup in 2021.

Mount won the UEFA European Under-19 Championship with the England national under-19 team in 2017. He made his senior international debut in 2019, at age 20, and was part of the England team at UEFA Euro 2020 and the 2022 FIFA World Cup.

Early life
Mason Tony Mount was born on 10 January 1999, in Portsmouth, Hampshire, to parents Debbie and Tony Mount. His father, Tony, was a former non-league footballer who later coached local clubs, including Havant Town. As a child, Mount played locally for Boarhunt Rovers and United Services Portsmouth. In 2003, at age 4, he spent one day a week training in the academies at Portsmouth and Chelsea. Citing Frank Lampard, Luka Modrić and Andrés Iniesta as his favourite players, Mount eventually joined Chelsea in 2005.

Club career

Chelsea
At age 18, Mount was promoted to Chelsea's senior team; he previously debuted for the club's under-18 team in 2014, at age 15, and also appeared consistently for the club's under-21 team by 2016. Mount scored 10 goals in 30 games in the club's victorious 2016–17 U18 Premier League campaign. He also won two FA Youth Cups, the UEFA Youth League, and Chelsea Academy Player of the Year by 2017.

2017–19: Loans to Vitesse and Derby County
Mount joined Dutch Eredivisie club Vitesse on 24 July 2017 on a season-long loan. He made his first-team debut on 26 August, as a 77th-minute substitute during Vitesse's 2–1 home defeat against AZ. The following month, he was given his first start in Vitesse's KNVB Cup first-round defeat away to fifth-tier team Swift, playing the full 90 minutes of the 0–0 draw, which Swift won in a penalty shoot-out. He scored his first goal for Vitesse on 1 October in the 76th minute of a 1–1 home draw with Utrecht. Mount went onto appear in the Eredivisie Team of the Year and won Vitesse Player of the Year.

During Vitesse's Eredivisie European play-off semi-final first leg against ADO Den Haag on 9 May 2018, Mount scored his first hat-trick, as Vitesse won 5–2 away. In the second leg, Mount scored in a 2–1 win as Vitesse won 7–3 on aggregate. In the first leg of the final against Utrecht, Mount opened the scoring but was booked and therefore suspended for the second leg. Mount made 39 appearances in all competitions for Vitesse, scoring 14 times, before returning to Chelsea.

Mount joined Championship club Derby County on 17 July 2018 on a season-long loan. He scored a 60th-minute equaliser on his debut for Derby on 3 August 2018, during a 2–1 away victory over Reading. Mount was sidelined for two months after suffering a hamstring injury in a FA Cup game against Accrington Stanley. He returned in a 6–1 win over Rotherham United, winning a penalty for teammate Martyn Waghorn and later scoring. Two weeks later, he scored his second senior hat-trick in a 4–0 Championship league game against Bolton Wanderers, keeping Derby in contention for the promotion playoff.

2019–20: First-team breakthrough

On 15 July 2019, Mount signed a new five-year contract with Chelsea, which would keep him at the club until 2024. He made his competitive debut for Chelsea on 11 August 2019 in a 4-0 away defeat to Manchester United in the Premier League. He scored his first Chelsea goal a week later against Leicester City during Frank Lampard’s home debut as manager at Stamford Bridge, a 1–1 draw, and added another in the next game away to Norwich City, in a 2-3 away win. On 17 September, he suffered an ankle injury against Valencia in the Champions League opener.

In March 2020, Mount was spoken to by Chelsea for ignoring self-isolation rules during the COVID-19 pandemic. While the entire squad was forced to self-isolate due to Callum Hudson-Odoi's positive COVID-19 test, Mount had gone to play football with friends, including West Ham's Declan Rice. On 19 July 2020, Mount scored in the FA Cup semi-final 3-1 win against Manchester United, helping Chelsea earn a place in the FA Cup Final. On 22 July, he became the first Chelsea Academy graduate to make his first team debut and complete 50 appearances in the same season. On the final day of the 2019–20 Premier League season in a 2–0 victory against Wolves, Mount scored the first goal from a free kick and assisted Olivier Giroud for the second goal to help Chelsea secure a place in the 2020–21 UEFA Champions League. Mount was named in the starting 11 against Arsenal in the FA Cup final on 1 August - Chelsea would go on to lose 2-1.

2020–21: Champions League win and Chelsea player of the year
Mount started the 2020–21 season well, as he featured in all Chelsea matches including the one against Barnsley in the third round of the EFL Cup on 23 September, which ended in a 6–0 win at home. Three days later on 26 September, Mount scored his first goal of the season against West Bromwich Albion in a 3–3 away draw, in which Chelsea would come back 3-0 down to draw. In the next fixture, however, Mount missed the decisive penalty in Chelsea’s 5–4 shoot-out loss away to Tottenham Hotspur in the fourth round of the EFL Cup on 29 September. He scored in back-to-back games in January, first in a 4–0 home win against Morecambe in the third round of the FA Cup and then away to Fulham in a 1–0 Premier League victory. On 24 January 2021, Mount captained Chelsea for the first time in a 3–1 win at home over Luton Town in the FA Cup. On 4 March, Mount scored the only goal in a 1–0 away league win over Liverpool, handing the Reds their fifth consecutive league defeat at Anfield for the first time in their history.

Mount scored his first goal in European football in Chelsea's 2–0 win over Porto in the first leg of the Champions League quarter-final on 7 April, becoming the youngest Chelsea player to score in the Champions League knockout stage. On 27 April, he marked his 100th appearance for Chelsea in a 1–1 away draw against Real Madrid in the Champions League semi-final first leg. In the second leg at Stamford Bridge on 5 May, he scored the second goal in a 2–0 win over Real Madrid, which helped Chelsea advance to the Champions League Final 3–1 on aggregate.

Early in the season, Mount's presence in the Chelsea and England starting line-ups was alleged by fans and media to be because of favouritism by respective team managers, Lampard and Gareth Southgate. These doubts were allayed after Thomas Tuchel acknowledged Chelsea's growing reliance on Mount calling him "crucial for our game" and "an absolutely key player" and endorsed him as one of the best players in Europe. On 18 May, Mount was voted as Chelsea's Player of the Year. On 29 May, Mount provided the assist for Kai Havertz's goal, as Chelsea won 1–0 against Manchester City in the final in Porto to win the Champions League for the second time in their history, and Mount’s first trophy with the club.

2021–22: Second Chelsea Player of the Year

On 11 August 2021, following a 1–1 draw after extra time in the 2021 UEFA Super Cup against Villarreal, Mount scored Chelsea's fourth penalty in the resulting shoot-out, which saw Chelsea triumph 6–5 for their second UEFA Super Cup title. On 8 October, Mount was one of five Chelsea players included in the final 30-man shortlist for the 2021 Ballon d'Or. The Ballon d’Or was won by Lionel Messi, and Mount would place 19th in the rankings. On 23 October, Mount scored his first goals of the season, and his first hat-trick for Chelsea, in a 7–0 home win over Norwich City.

In December, Mount became the youngest Chelsea player to score in four consecutive Premier League games, with a goal and assist in back-to-back trips to Watford and West Ham, and then scoring at home against Leeds United and Everton. On 16 December, at 22 years and 340 days, Mount became the youngest Chelsea player to score 20 Premier League goals in the competition's history. As a result of his four goals and three assists during the December 2021 month, he was nominated for Player of the Month and his goal against West Ham was nominated for Goal of the Month, which were eventually won by Raheem Sterling and Alexandre Lacazette, respectively.

Mount made his 100th Premier League appearance on 20 April 2022, marking the occasion with an assist, although this ended in a 2–4 home defeat against Arsenal.
On 11 May, Mount scored his 11th Premier League goal of the season and assisted Christian Pulisic to make it 2–0 against Leeds United, giving him double digits in both goals and assists and becoming only the fifth Chelsea player (as well as the youngest) to reach that landmark in a season. In the next game, however, Mount and César Azpilicueta would miss  penalties in a penalty shootout against Liverpool in the FA Cup Final, as the Reds would win 6–5 on penalties, on 14 May. Mount was named Chelsea's player of the season for a second consecutive season on 22 May, becoming the 12th player to win it more than once.

2022–23: Dip in form and scrutiny

Mount had a difficult start to the new 2022–23 season, as he registered no goal contributions in the Blues' first seven games under Thomas Tuchel, despite featuring in all seven matches. A 1–0 away loss at Dinamo Zagreb in the Champions League would ultimately see Tuchel get sacked the following day. Mount's peformance in the game was heavily criticised, with critics claiming that he "disappeared". Graham Potter, who had previously managed at Brighton & Hove Albion, would be announced as the new Chelsea head coach soon after. Mount would find some good form during the start of Potter's reign, picking up two assists for teammates Kai Havertz and Christian Pulisic in a 3–0 home victory against Wolves on 8 October. In the next fixture three days later, Mount won a penalty after being fouled by former Chelsea teammate Fikayo Tomori, which Jorginho scored, before later assisting Pierre-Emerick Aubameyang's goal, in a 2–0 away win at A.C. Milan. Mount would also win man of the match for his performance. Mount scored his first goals of the season on 16 October, scoring a brace in a 2–0 away victory against Aston Villa.

International career

Youth
Mount has represented England at under-16, under-17, under-18 and under-19 levels. Mount represented the under-17s at the 2016 UEFA European Under-17 Championship.

Mount was included in the under-19 team for the 2017 UEFA European Under-19 Championship. He provided the assist for Lukas Nmecha to score the winning goal against Portugal in the final. He was subsequently named Golden Player of the tournament. On 27 May 2019, Mount was included in England's 23-man squad for the 2019 UEFA European Under-21 Championship.

Senior

Following his impressive season with Vitesse, Mount was invited by manager Gareth Southgate to train with the senior team for a week ahead of the 2018 FIFA World Cup. He was called up to the senior team for the UEFA Nations League matches against Croatia and Spain in October 2018. Mount made his debut for the England senior team on 7 September 2019 as a 67th-minute substitute in England's 4–0 home win over Bulgaria in UEFA Euro 2020 qualifying. He scored his first goal for England on 17 November in a 4–0 away win against Kosovo in UEFA Euro 2020 qualifying.

Mount was named in the 26-man England squad for Euro 2020. On 22 June 2021, Mount and fellow England player Ben Chilwell were forced to self-isolate after coming into contact with Scotland player Billy Gilmour, who tested positive for COVID-19 after England's 0–0 draw with Scotland at the tournament.

Mount was included in the England squad for the 2022 FIFA World Cup.

Personal life
Mount has been best friends with fellow England international Declan Rice since childhood. Mount supports Portsmouth, citing former Portsmouth players such as Peter Crouch, Jermain Defoe and Nwankwo Kanu as his footballing heroes whilst growing up. He attended Purbrook Park School. In 2021, Mount became a patron of the charity Together for Short Lives.

Career statistics

Club

International

England score listed first, score column indicates score after each Mount goal

Honours
Chelsea Youth
 U18 Premier League: 2016–17
 FA Youth Cup: 2015–16, 2016–17
 UEFA Youth League: 2015–16

Chelsea
 UEFA Champions League: 2020–21
 UEFA Super Cup: 2021
 FIFA Club World Cup: 2021
 FA Cup runner-up: 2019–20, 2020–21, 2021–22
 EFL Cup runner-up: 2021–22

England U19
 UEFA European Under-19 Championship: 2017

England
 UEFA European Championship runner-up: 2020

Individual
 Chelsea Academy Player of the Year: 2016–17
 UEFA European Under-19 Championship Team of the Tournament: 2017
 UEFA European Under-19 Championship Golden Player: 2017
 Eredivisie Talent of the Month: January 2018
 Vitesse Player of the Year: 2017–18
 Eredivisie Team of the Year: 2017–18
 Chelsea Player of the Year: 2020–21, 2021–22
 UEFA Champions League Squad of the Season: 2020–21
 Premier League Academy Graduate of the Year: 2020–21

References

External links

 Profile at the Chelsea F.C. website
 Profile at the Football Association website
 

1999 births
Living people
Footballers from Portsmouth
English footballers
Association football midfielders
Chelsea F.C. players
SBV Vitesse players
Derby County F.C. players
Eredivisie players
English Football League players
Premier League players
FA Cup Final players
UEFA Champions League winning players
England youth international footballers
England under-21 international footballers
England international footballers
UEFA Euro 2020 players
2022 FIFA World Cup players
English expatriate footballers
Expatriate footballers in the Netherlands
English expatriate sportspeople in the Netherlands